Gaiety Theatre or Gayety Theatre, and variations may refer to theaters (or theatres) in:

Asia
 Gaiety Theater (Manila) (1935), Philippines
 Gaiety Theatre, Shimla (opened 1887), Shimla, India
 Gaiety Theatre, Yokohama (1870–1923), destroyed in the 1923 Kanto earthquake, Japan

Australia
 Gaiety Theatre, Melbourne (1880–1930), Australia
 Gaiety Theatre, Sydney (1880–1900), Australia
 Gaiety Theatre, Zeehan (1898), Tasmania, Australia

Europe 
 Gaiety Theatre, Ayr, a theatre in Ayr, Scotland (1871)
 Gaiety Theatre, Dublin, a theatre in Dublin, Ireland (opened 1871)
 Gaiety Theatre, London, a musical theatre in London, UK (1864–1956)
 Gaiety Theatre, Manchester, UK (1884–1957)
 Gaiety Theatre, Isle of Man, an opera house and theatre in Douglas (opened 1900)
 The Gaiety Theatre, Anglesey Castle, a private theatre at Plas Newydd (Anglesey) in Wales, UK (closed 1905)
 Gaiety Cinema & Theatre, Scarborough, England (1920–late 1960's)

United States 
 Gaiety Theatre, Boston (1878), Massachusetts
 Gaiety Theatre, Boston (1908) (1908–1949), Massachusetts
 Gaiety Theatre, New York (male burlesque) (1976–2005), a male burlesque theater in New York, New York
 Gaiety Theatre (New York City)  (1908–1982), a legitimate theater in New York, New York
 Village East by Angelika, formerly the Gayety Theatre, a movie theater in New York, New York
 Gayety Theater, Washington, D.C. (1907-1959); see architectural sculptor Ernest C. Bairstow
 Gayety Theater, former name of the Byham Theater in Pittsburgh, Pennsylvania

See also 
 Gaiety (disambiguation)
 Theatre (disambiguation)

Lists of theatres